The following is a list of people of full or partial Turkish Cypriot origin. This includes notable people in the community who were born on the island of Cyprus during the Ottoman era (1570-1878/1914), the British era (1878/1914-1960), as well as with the formation of the Republic of Cyprus (1960–present), the Turkish Federated State of Cyprus (1975–83), and the Turkish Republic of Northern Cyprus (1983–present).

In addition, due to the large Turkish Cypriot diaspora living outside of the island, there are many notable people of Turkish Cypriot origin who are living in Turkey, the United Kingdom, Australia, the United States, Canada, Jordan, Egypt, Germany, New Zealand, Norway etc. These individuals are listed with their citizenship (i.e. as "Turkish", "British", "Australian", "American", "Canadian", "Jordanian", "Egyptian", "German", "New Zealander", "Norwegian" etc.) alongside their notability and connection to the Turkish Cypriot community. Those with dual citizenship (i.e. who were born in Cyprus and have emigrated abroad) are listed as "Turkish Cypriot-born" alongside the citizenship they have acquired.

Academia and medicine
 
 
  
Mehmet Aziz, medical researcher; widely credited with eradicating malaria in Cyprus
Turkan Aziz, the first female Chief Matron of Nicosia (appointed in 1963)  
Erkin Bairam, Turkish Cypriot-born New Zealander economist at the University of Otago 
Ulus Baker, Turkish-born sociologist (Turkish Cypriot parents) 
Niyazi Berkes, sociologist 
Süleyman Başak, British Professor of Finance at the London Business School
Servet Sami Dedeçay, criminologist 
Mustafa Djamgoz, British Professor of Cancer Biology at Imperial College London and Chairman of the College of Medicine’s Science Council
Ahmet Bican Ercilasun, Turkish-born linguist, Turcologist and author (Turkish Cypriot father)
Erol Erduran, educator 
Fahir Ersin, Turkish political scientist and journalist (Turkish Cypriot father)
Ten Feizi, Turkish Cypriot-born British Professor and Director of the Glycosciences Laboratory at Imperial College London 
Bayram Göçmen, parasitologist, herpetologist, taxonomist and nature photographer  
Halil Güven, Turkish Cypriot-born American mechanical engineer; Dean of San Diego State University - Georgia
Melahat Hulusi Hacıbulgur, head of the first blood bank established in Cyprus in (1953–63); established and directed a second blood bank in the Turkish part of Nicosia (1963–70)
Mustafa Halilsoy, theoretical physicist
Mehmet Hasgüler, political scientist 
Erol Kaymak, political scientist 
Ozay Mehmet, Turkish Cypriot-born Canadian Professor of International Affairs at Carleton University
Kamil Özerk, Turkish Cypriot-born Norwegian Professor of Pedagogy at the University of Oslo
Meral R. Özerk, Turkish Cypriot-born Norwegian author and senior advisor at Statped
Öztekin Öztekiner, physician 
Necmettin pamir, neurosurgery 
Arda Topal, scientist; Chairman of Cyprus Space Institute
Asım Vehbi,  educator; CEO and Vice-Chancellor of Girne American University
Vamık Volkan, Turkish Cypriot-born American Professor of Psychiatry at the University of Virginia
Kamer Yusuf, one of the first Turkish Cypriot women pharmacists
Ayşe Zeki, Canadian-born psychiatrist and the current president of the Refugee Rights Association in Northern Cyprus (Turkish Cypriot parents)

Arts and literature 
 
 
 

Alev Adil, British-born writer, artist and academic (Turkish Cypriot parents) 
Mustafa İzzet Adiloğlu, poet
Aydin Mehmet Ali, British author and peace campaigner
Ayhatun Ateşin, ceramic artist 
Ruzen Atakan, painter 
Ibrahim Aziz, political analyst 
Urkiye Mine Balman, poet
Taner Baybars, Turkish Cypriot-born British poet (Turkish Cypriot parents)  
Hussein Bicar, Egyptian-born painter (Turkish Cypriot origin) 
Neriman Cahit, poet; a vocal advocate of women's rights
Cevdet Hüseyin Çağdaş, painter and museologist
Mutlu Çerkez, British-born Australian artist (Turkish Cypriot parents)
Emin Çizenel, painter
Fikret Demirağ, poet
Nazif Süleyman Ebeoğlu, poet 
Hasan Hilmi Efendi, Ottoman poet 
Tracey Emin, British-born artist (Turkish Cypriot father)
Sümer Erek, Turkish Cypriot-born British artist
İsmet Güney, artist; designer of the Flag of Cyprus 
Nilgün Güney, painter and writer 
Feride Hikmet, poet 
Sibel Hodge, British-born writer (Turkish Cypriot father)
Mustafa Hulusi, British-born artist (Turkish Cypriot parents)
Ümit Hussein, British-born literary translator and interpreter (Turkish Cypriot parents) 
Yaşar İsmailoğlu, Turkish Cypriot-born British poet
Hikmet Afif Mapolar, novelist 
Erten Kasımoğlu, cartoonist 
Pembe Marmara, poet
Filiz Naldöven, poet 
Kaytazzade Mehmet Nazım, Ottoman poet 
Ali Nesim, poet
Arif Ozakca, British-born artist (Turkish Cypriot origin)
Kâmil Özay, poet
Ejdan Sadrazam, poet 
Faize Özdemirciler, poet 
Özden Selenge, painter and writer
Zehra Şonya, sculptor  
Hasan Tahsin, Ottoman poet 
Şinasi Tekman, painter, sculptor, poet and writer
Osman Türkay, poet; nominee for the Nobel Prize for Literature in 1988
Süleyman Uluçamgil, poet 
Gürkan Uluçhan, writer 
Semih Sait Umar, writer
Derviş Vahdeti, Ottoman journalist, writer and clergyman
Mehmet Yaşın, poet and author
Neşe Yaşın, poet and author
Özker Yaşın, poet and author

Business
Serhat Akpınar, entrepreneur and educator; founder of Girne American University and American University of Cyprus
Mehmet Dalman, Turkish Cypriot-born British investment banker and chairman of Welsh football club Cardiff City
Bulent Hass Dellal, Australian-born director and chairman of the Special Broadcasting Service (Turkish Cypriot parents)
Memduh Erdal, businessman 
Şemsi Kazım Erkman, businessman
Suat Günsel, billionaire; property developer and founder of the Near East University 
Ali Guryel, British entrepreneur; founder of Bromcom
Hattie Hasan, British-born CEO of the Stopcocks Women Plumbers (Turkish Cypriot parents)
Fatma Kiamil, Turkish Cypriot-born British entrepreneur; co-founder of JJ Food Service (listed in the Sunday Times Rich List 2020)
Mustafa Kiamil, Turkish Cypriot-born British entrepreneur; co-founder of JJ Food Service (listed in the Sunday Times Rich List 2020)
Asil Nadir, businessman
Ozan Ozerk, Norwegian businessman; co-founder of Biip.no (Turkish Cypriot parents)
Touker Suleyman, Turkish Cypriot-born British fashion retail entrepreneur and a "dragon" on Dragon's Den

Cinema and television
 
 
 

Nej Adamson, British-born actor (Turkish Cypriot parents)
Zeki Alasya, Turkish-born actor (Turkish Cypriot origin; descendant of Kıbrıslı Mehmed Kamil Pasha)
Osman Alkaş, actor 
Ferhat Atik, filmmaker, scenario writer and novelist
Feri Cansel, Turkish Cypriot-born British and Turkish actress
Zümrüt Cansel, British-born Turkish actress (Turkish Cypriot mother)
Kem Cetinay, British-born TV personality and rapper (Turkish Cypriot parents) 
Haldun Dormen, Turkish-born actor (Turkish Cypriot father)
Ali Düşenkalkar, actor 
Munis Düşenkalkar, Turkish-born actor (Turkish Cypriot origin) 
Jaye Ersavaş, British-actor (Turkish Cypriot mother and Turkish father)
Aslı Enver, British-born Turkish actress (Turkish Cypriot father)
Hazar Ergüçlü, actress 
Mem Ferda, British-born actor (Turkish Cypriot parents)
Tamer Garip, film director 
Akin Gazi, British-born actor (Turkish Cypriot parents)
Tamer Hassan, British-born actor (Turkish Cypriot parents)
Belle Hassan, British-born model; Season 5 of Love Island (Turkish Cypriot father)
Aykut Hilmi, British-born actor (Turkish Cypriot father)
Metin Hüseyin, British-born film director (Turkish Cypriot parents)
Hüseyin Köroğlu, actor 
Erim Metto, British-born film director (Turkish Cypriot parents)
Mem Morrison, British-born actor (Turkish Cypriot parents)
Erkan Mustafa, British-born actor (Turkish Cypriot parents)
Cosh Omar, British-born actor (Turkish Cypriot parents)
Hal Ozsan, Turkish Cypriot-born British and American actor 
İnci Pars Özgürgün, actress 
Selen Öztürk, Turkish-born actress  (Turkish Cypriot mother) 
Erol Refikoğlu, actor; co-founder of the Nicosia Municipal Theater
Sinem Saban,  Australian-born film writer, producer, director, and human rights activist (Turkish Cypriot parents)
Tolga Safer, British-born actor (Turkish Cypriot parents)
Meliz Serman, British-born stage actress
Kemal Shahin, British-born Big Brother contestant (Turkish Cypriot parents) 
Anna Silk, Canadian-born actress (Turkish Cypriot-British mother) 
Ilkay Silk, Turkish Cypriot-born Canadian actress, playwright, producer, and educator
Mine Teber, actress 
Aden Theobald, British-born Big Brother contestant (Turkish Cypriot mother)
Üner Ulutuğ, theatre artist and director
Sezer Yurtseven, British-born Big Brother contestant (Turkish Cypriot parents)
Anatol Yusef, British-born actor (Turkish Cypriot parents)
Çağlar Yüksel, actor 
Derviş Zaim, filmmaker

Design and fashion
 
Mustafa Aslanturk, Turkish Cypriot-born British fashion designer
Raşit Bağzıbağlı, British-born fashion designer (Turkish Cypriot parents)
Hussein Chalayan, MBE, Turkish Cypriot-born British fashion designer
Nasir Mazhar, British-born fashion designer (Turkish Cypriot parents)

Food
Refika Birgül, Turkish-born celebrity chef (Turkish Cypriot mother) 
Leyla Kazim, British-born food and travel photographer (Turkish Cypriot father) 
Selin Kiazim, British-born chef and winner of the Great British Menu (Turkish Cypriot parents)
Ismail Tosun, Turkish-born Australian celebrity chef (Turkish Cypriot mother)
Zeren Wilson, British-born food and wine specialist and columnist (Turkish Cypriot mother)

Journalism
Kutlu Adalı, peace advocate
Alkan Chaglar, British-born Canadian journalist (Turkish Cypriot parents)
Başaran Düzgün, journalist 
Haşmet Muzaffer Gürkan, journalist, writer and researcher
Bener Hakkı Hakeri, journalist 
Yücel Hatay, sports journalist 
Ayhan Hikmet, journalist; editor of the Turkish Cypriot weekly newspaper Cumhuriyet
Metin Münir, journalist 
Fazıl Önder, journalist; peace advocate
Sevgül Uludağ, journalist, peace and gender activist

Law
Gönül Başaran Erönen, British-born judge in the TRNC Supreme Court (Turkish Cypriot origin)
Narin Ferdi Şefik, President of the TRNC Supreme Court

Military 
Patrick Azimkar, British-born soldier killed during the Massereene Barracks shooting in 2009 (Turkish Cypriot father)  
Özer Türkmen,  head of the TRNC army

Music
  
 
  
 
Acar Akalın, composer, guitarist and singer
Beyhan Demirdağ Alkan, mezzo-soprano
Erol Alkan, British-born DJ and producer
Kader Ateş, singer 
Peri Aziz, British-born singer and former member of Babutsa 
Kamran Aziz, musician
Nil Burak, pop singer and actress
Buray, pop singer
Gültekin Çeki, Turkish-born classical music singer and composer (Turkish Cypriot father)
En Derin, singer
Jale Derviş, pianist 
Genco Ecer, Turkish-born singer (Turkish Cypriot father)
Okan Ersan, jazz fusion guitarist, composer and record artist
Oytun Ersan, bass guitarist and composer
Aslı Giray, Turkish-born musician 
Adam Harison, British-born singer-songwriter; appeared on Little Mix The Search; and pitch invader during the 2020 UEFA European Football Championship final match (Turkish Cypriot origin)
Turgay Hilmi, French horn player
Atila Huseyin, British-born jazz singer
Işın Karaca, British-born Turkish singer (Turkish Cypriot mother)
Fikri Karayel, rock singer and songwriter
Tolga Kashif, British-born music conductor
Eylem Kızıl, British-born singer (Turkish Cypriot parents) 
Dogan Mehmet, British-born musician (Turkish Cypriot parents)
Ayla Peksoylu, British-born singer (Turkish Cypriot father) 
Tony Perry, British-born Wembley Stadium DJ; introduced the song Sweet Caroline as England’s unofficial anthem during the 2020 UEFA European Football Championship (Turkish Cypriot origin)
Arman Ratip, pianist 
Sav Remzi, British-born record producer
Ziynet Sali, Turkish Cypriot-born British singer
SOS, rock band
Zeliş Şenol, singer
Ali Sönmez, British-born musician; lead singer of Babutsa
Rüya Taner, German-born pianist (Turkish Cypriot parents)
Tash, British-born singer
Hakan Tuna, British-born rock musician; member of the band Natural Life (Turkish Cypriot parents)
Soner Türsoy, Turkish Cypriot-born British musician; member of Babutsa
B Young, British-born rapper and singer-songwriter

Politics 

 

 

Sonay Adem, TRNC Minister for Labor and Social Security (2005–09)
Peray Ahmet, British-born leader of Haringey London Borough Council (Turkish Cypriot parents)
Asım Akansoy,  TRNC Minister of Interior and Labor (2015–16)
Mustafa Akıncı, President of Northern Cyprus (2015–20)
Hakkı Atun, Prime Minister of Northern Cyprus (1994–96)
Sunat Atun, TRNC Minister of Economy and Energy (2016–18)
Perihan Arıburun, Turkish politician (Turkish Cypriot origin; descendant of Kıbrıslı Mehmed Kamil Pasha)
Turgay Avcı, leader of the Freedom and Reform Party (ÖRP)
Ahmet Yalçın Benli, Mayor of  Gönyeli (2006–present)
Ahmet Mithat Berberoğlu, founder of the Republican Turkish Party (CTP)
Beran Bertuğ, first female kaymakam of Gazimağusa
Filiz Besim, Minister of Health (2018–present) 
Ziver K. Bodamyalızade, Mayor of the Nicosia Turkish Municipality (1969–76)
Şemi Bora, Mayor of the Nicosia Turkish Municipality (1994-2002)
Hasan Bozer, speaker of the Assembly of Northern Cyprus (2009–13)
Gülsen Bozkurt, Minister of Health and the Environment (1999-2001) 
Cemal Metin Bulutoğluları, Mayor of the Nicosia Turkish Municipality (2006–13)
Nesil Caliskan, British-born politician; Enfield London Borough Council's first female leader (Turkish Cypriot parents)
Fuat Celalettin, Mayor of the Nicosia Turkish Municipality (1962-1969)
Mete Coban, Turkish-Cypriot born British Labour Councillor for Stoke Newington; founder of My Life My Say
Mustafa Çağatay, Prime Minister of the Turkish Federated State of Cyprus and the TRNC (1978–83)
Mehmet Çakıcı, first leader of the Communal Democracy Party (TDP) (2007–13)
Zeki Çeler, member of the TDP
Emine Çolak, TRNC Minister of Foreign Affairs (2015–16)
Derviş Kemal Deniz, TRNC Minister of Economy and Tourism 
Raif Denktaş, UBP MP (1983–85)
Rauf Denktaş, second Vice President of Cyprus (1973–74); first President of Northern Cyprus (1983-2005) 
Serdar Denktaş, leader of the Democratic Party (1996-2018); Deputy President of Northern Cyprus (1996–98; 2005–06; 2013–15; and 2016–19)
Doğuş Derya, CTP MP (2013–present)
Meral Ece, British-born politician; Liberal Democrats member of the House of Lords (Turkish Cypriot parents)
Emma Edhem, British-born councilwoman of the City of London Corporation (Turkish Cypriot parents)
Hacı Rasıh Efendi, Ottoman politician; the first mayor of Lefke (1900–08)
Fatma Ekenoğlu, first female Speaker of the Republican Assembly of Northern Cyprus (2004–09)
Ahmet Erdengiz, Ambassador of the TRNC to the United States of America (1998-2002)
Kutlay Erk, Mayor of the Nicosia Turkish Municipality (2002–06)
Tufan Erhürman, Prime Minister of Northern Cyprus (2018–19)
Derviş Eroğlu, Prime Minister of Northern Cyprus (1985–94, 1996–2004 and 2009–10); third President of Northern Cyprus (2010–15)
Tahsin Ertuğruloğlu, Minister of Foreign Affairs and Defense (1998-2004; 2016–18; 2020-present)
Ahmet Şükrü Esmer, Turkish MP for Istanbul (1939) (born in Nicosia)
Kadri Fellahoğlu, Mayor of the Nicosia Turkish Municipality (2013–14)
Tahsin Gözmen, first Mayor of the Nicosia Turkish Municipality (1958-1961)
Kadriye Hulusi Hacıbulgur, first woman in Cyprus to be a member of the Communal Chamber (1960–70)
Mehmet Harmancı, Mayor of the Nicosia Turkish Municipality (2014–present)
Richard Hickmet, British-born Conservative MP in 1983-87 (Turkish Cypriot father)
Hutch Hussein, Australian-born State President of the Victorian branch of the Australian Labor Party (ALP) between 2016-19 (Turkish Cypriot parents)
Sıla Usar İncirli, politician, neurologist, researcher and trade unionist
Ömer Kalyoncu, Prime Minister of Northern Cyprus (2015–16)
Ahmet Kaşif, member of UBP 
Derviş Ali Kavazoğlu, member of AKEL 
Oktay Kayalp, Mayor of Famagusta (1994-2014)
Ayla Halit Kazım, first woman in Cyprus to be a member of the House of Representatives of Cyprus (1963)
Niyazi Kızılyürek, first Turkish Cypriot to be elected as a Member of the European Parliament
Nejat Konuk, Prime Minister of Northern Cyprus (1983–85) 
Namık Korhan, TRNC representative at Washington (1992–97); representative at London (2001–06); Ambassador to Turkey (2009–10)
İsmet Kotak, co-founder of the Democratic People's Party and founder of the Free Democratic Party
Fazıl Küçük, first Vice President of the Republic of Cyprus (1959–73)
İrsen Küçük, Prime Minister of Northern Cyprus (2010–13)
Özdil Nami, British-born politician; Minister of Foreign Affairs of Northern Cyprus (2013–15); Minister of Economy and Energy of Northern Cyprus (2018–present) (Turkish Cypriot parents)
Niyazi Manyera, first Minister of Health of the Republic of Cyprus (1960–74)
Cevdet Mirata, Deputy President of the Nicosia Turkish Municipality (1961–62)
Özkan Murat, TRNC Minister of Interior 
Osman Örek, first Minister of Defence of the Republic of Cyprus (1960–64); Prime Minister of Northern Cyprus (1978)   
Afet Özcafer, Clerk of the TRNC Assembly
Kudret Özersay, leader of the HP (2016–20); Deputy Prime Minister of Northern Cyprus (2018–20)
Özker Özgür, Deputy Prime Minister of Northern Cyprus (1994–95); leader of CTP (1976–96)
Hüseyin Özgürgün, Prime Minister of Northern Cyprus (2010; 2016–18)
Canan Öztoprak, founding member of the Cyprus Conflict Resolution Trainers Group 
Hüseyin Öztoprak, former TRNC Minister of Agriculture 
Kıbrıslı Mehmed Emin Pasha, Grand Vizier of the Ottoman Empire (1854; 1859; and 1860–61)
Kâmil Pasha, Grand Vizier of the Ottoman Empire  (1885-1891; 1895; 1908–09; and 1912–13)
Raşit Pertev, Secretary of the International Fund for Agricultural Development (2013–present)
Ali Pilli, TRNC Minister of Health (2019–present)
Kenan Poleo, British-born Consul General and Trade Commissioner for Eastern Europe and Central Asia (Turkish Cypriot parents)
Ersan Saner, Prime Minister of Northern Cyprus (2020–present)
Abbas Sınay, member of CTP 
Sibel Siber, first female Prime Minister of Northern Cyprus (2013–18) 
Ferdi Sabit Soyer, Prime Minister of Northern Cyprus (2005–09)
Natalie Suleyman, Australian-born politician; the first Turkish Cypriot, and the first Muslim woman, to be elected to the Victorian Parliament (Turkish Cypriot parents)
Hasan Taçoy, Minister of Public Works and Transport (2009–10 and 2014–15)
Mehmet Ali Talat, President of Northern Cyprus (2005–10)
Oya Talat, President of the Patriotic Women's Union
Ersin Tatar, President of Northern Cyprus (2020–present) 
Alparslan Türkeş, founder of the Nationalist Movement Party
Mustafa Yektaoğlu, member of CTP
Burhan Yetkili, Mayor of the Nicosia Turkish Municipality (1990-1994)
Özkan Yorgancıoğlu, Prime Minister of Northern Cyprus (2013–15)
Ahmet Uzun, TRNC Minister of Finance (2004–09)

Religion
Mehmet Adil, Syrian-born Sufi; leader of the worldwide Naqshbandi Sufi order (Turkish Cypriot father) 
Mehmet Nazım Adil, Sufi sheikh and spiritual leader of the Naqshbandi tariqa
, Danish-born imam (Turkish Cypriot parents)
Abdul Kerim al-Qubrusi, Turkish Cypriot-born American Sufi sheikh
Ramadan Güney, Turkish Cypriot-born British community leader; founder of the first Turkish mosque in the UK (Shacklewell Lane Mosque); and former owner of the UK's largest cemetery Brookwood Cemetery (Turkish Cypriot origin)
Şule Yüksel Şenler, Turkish-born activist; the first woman to introduce the hijab concept to urban daily life in modern Turkey (Turkish Cypriot parents)

Royalty 

Zein Al-Sharaf Talal, Egyptian-born Queen of Jordan (granddaughter of the Ottoman Cypriot governor Shakir Pasha)   Her children include:
Hussein bin Talal, King of Jordan
Muhammad bin Talal, Jordanian prince
Hassan bin Talal, Jordanian prince
Basma bint Talal, Jordanian princess

Sports
 
 
 
 
 
 

Mete Adanır, football player 
Ümit Aktül, football coach 
Emin Atabek, football player 
Jack Aziz,  Australian-born football player (Turkish Cypriot origin)
Aziz Behich, Australian-born football player (Turkish Cypriot parents)
Ayten Berkalp, volleyball player 
Adam Booth, British-born boxing trainer and manager of David Haye (Turkish Cypriot parents)
Zehra Borazancı, female football player 
Rhian Brewster, British-born football player (Turkish Cypriot mother) 
Ulaş Candanal, football player 
Hamis Çakır, football player 
Ayşe Çetinkaya, female football player 
Kamil Ahmet Çörekçi, British-born Turkish football player (Turkish Cypriot parents)
Toygar Davulcu, football coach 
Çiler Demirtay, female football player
Serhat Deniz, sports manager and coach 
Mejdi Direniş, football player 
Yasin Doğan, football player
Murat Erdoğan, British-born football player (Turkish Cypriot parents)
Erden Eruç, Turkish Cypriot-born American adventurer; first person to complete an entirely solo and human-powered circumnavigation of the Earth
Erten Gazi, Turkish Cypriot born-basketball player 
Hakan Hayrettin, British-born football player (Turkish Cypriot parents)
Yiğitcan Hekimoğlu, Turkish Cypriot-born Turkish sprinter 
Mustafa Hussein, football player (Turkish Cypriot origin)
Kemal Izzet, British-born football player (Turkish Cypriot father)
Muzzy Izzet, British-born Turkish football player (Turkish Cypriot father)
İzzet Kaçmaz, football player and coach
Erol Kahraman, British-born Canadian and Turkish ice hockey player (Turkish Cypriot parents)  
Jem Karacan, British-born Turkish football player (Turkish Cypriot father)
Şerif Ogan Karabıyıklı, female football player 
Ahmet Karlankuş, football player
Colin Kazim-Richards, British-born Turkish football player (Turkish Cypriot mother)
Dervis Konuralp, British-born Paralympic swimmer (Turkish Cypriot father)
Billy Mehmet, British-born Irish and TRNC football player (Turkish Cypriot father)
Dave Mehmet, British-born football player (Turkish Cypriot parents)
Deniz Mehmet, British-born football player (Turkish Cypriot parents)
Kemal Molla, football player 
Tarkan Mustafa, British-born football player (Turkish Cypriot parents)
Önder Mutsuzlar, football coach
Ahmet Ogan, coach and sports manager
Reşat Oğuz, athlete
Yılmaz Orhan, Turkish Cypriot-born American football player 
Levent Osman, Australian-born football player (Turkish Cypriot parents)
Erhun Oztumer, British-born football player (Turkish Cypriot parents)
İrfan Özbay, football player 
Kenan Özer, football player 
Bayram Özgün, football player 
Ahmet Patterson, British-born boxer (Turkish Cypriot father)
Meliz Redif, female sprinter/track runner
Omer Riza, British-born football player (Turkish Cypriot parents)
Başak Ruso, female football player
Mustafa Salk, football player 
Danis Salman, Turkish Cypriot-born British football player
Memduh Sarıoğlu, football player
Salih Say, football player
Esin Sonay, football player 
Fatih Terim, Turkish-born football player; former manager of the Turkey national football team (1993–96; 2005–09; and 2013–17) and current manager of Galatasaray (Turkish Cypriot father) 
Acelya Toprak, British-born martial artist; youngest winner at the European Judo Championships (Turkish Cypriot parents)
Tamer Tuna, British-born football player (Turkish Cypriot parents) 
Mustafa Vardi, football player
Özel Vasıf, tennis player 
Fatima Whitbread, British-born javelin thrower (Turkish Cypriot mother)
Halil Zorba, British-born weightlifter (Turkish Cypriot parents)

Others
Patrick Azimkar, British-born soldier killed during the Massereene Barracks shooting in 2009 (Turkish Cypriot father)  
Arifs, British criminal gang (Turkish Cypriot origin)
Aysha Frade, British-born victim killed during the 2017 Westminster attack (Turkish Cypriot father)

References

Turkish Cypriot people
Turks